Monsters is an anthology horror series that originally aired in syndication. It originally premiered on October 1, 1988, and ended on April 1, 1991, with a total of 72 episodes over the course of 3 seasons.

Episodes

Season 1 (1988–89)

Season 2 (1989–90)

Season 3 (1990–91)

Monsters (TV series)